Romey Gill (born Romey Singh Gill) (1979 – 24 June 2009)  was a Punjabi Indian singer. He had success with his songs Nahron Paar Bangla, Jeeto and Nakhra Chari Jawani Da.

Discography

Duo collaboration

Religious

Posthumous albums

References 

1979 births
2009 deaths
Indian male pop singers
Indian male singer-songwriters
Indian singer-songwriters
Bhangra (music) musicians
Punjabi-language singers
20th-century Indian singers
Singers from Punjab, India
20th-century Indian male singers